The West Barito languages are a group of half a dozen Dayak (Austronesian) languages of Borneo, Indonesia. They are named after the Barito River.

The languages are,

North: Kohin, Dohoi (Ot Danum), Siang
South: Mendawai, Bakumpai, Ngaju

References

Meyers, Jim, Ben Rice, Susan Rice and Heather Meyers. 2003. Report on the Seruyan River surveys in central Kalimantan: Kohin, Keninjal and Sebaun (Dohoi) languages. SIL Electronic Survey Report. SIL International.

 
Barito languages